Pierre de Sus served as bailli of the Principality of Achaea following the departure of Prince John of Gravina for Italy in spring 1326. He remained in office until 1327.

References

Sources
 

14th-century French people
Baillis of the Principality of Achaea
14th-century people from the Principality of Achaea